Iodine is a chemical element with the symbol I and atomic number 53. The element was discovered by the French chemist Bernard Courtois in 1811 and was named two years later by Joseph Louis Gay-Lussac, after the Ancient Greek  'violet-coloured'.

Iodine occurs in many oxidation states, including iodide (I−), iodate, and the various periodate anions. It is the least abundant of the stable halogens, being the sixty-first most abundant element. As the heaviest essential mineral nutrient, iodine is required for the synthesis of thyroid hormones. Iodine deficiency affects about two billion people and is the leading preventable cause of intellectual disabilities.

The dominant producers of iodine today are Chile and Japan. Due to its high atomic number and ease of attachment to organic compounds, it has also found favour as a non-toxic radiocontrast material. Because of the specificity of its uptake by the human body, radioactive isotopes of iodine can also be used to treat thyroid cancer. Iodine is also used as a catalyst in the industrial production of acetic acid and some polymers.

It is on the World Health Organization's List of Essential Medicines.

History
In 1811, iodine was discovered by French chemist Bernard Courtois, who was born to a manufacturer of saltpetre (an essential component of gunpowder). At the time of the Napoleonic Wars, saltpetre was in great demand in France. Saltpetre produced from French nitre beds required sodium carbonate, which could be isolated from seaweed collected on the coasts of Normandy and Brittany. To isolate the sodium carbonate, seaweed was burned and the ash washed with water. The remaining waste was destroyed by adding sulfuric acid. Courtois once added excessive sulfuric acid and a cloud of purple vapour rose. He noted that the vapour crystallised on cold surfaces, making dark crystals. Courtois suspected that this material was a new element but lacked funding to pursue it further.

Courtois gave samples to his friends, Charles Bernard Desormes (1777–1838) and Nicolas Clément (1779–1841), to continue research. He also gave some of the substance to chemist Joseph Louis Gay-Lussac (1778–1850), and to physicist André-Marie Ampère (1775–1836). On 29 November 1813, Desormes and Clément made Courtois' discovery public. They described the substance to a meeting of the Imperial Institute of France. On 6 December, Gay-Lussac announced that the new substance was either an element or a compound of oxygen. Gay-Lussac suggested the name "iode", from the Ancient Greek  ("violet"), because of the colour of iodine vapor. Ampère had given some of his sample to English chemist Humphry Davy (1778–1829), who experimented on the substance and noted its similarity to chlorine. Davy sent a letter dated 10 December to the Royal Society of London stating that he had identified a new element. Arguments erupted between Davy and Gay-Lussac over who identified iodine first, but both scientists acknowledged Courtois as the first to isolate the element.

In 1873 the French medical researcher Casimir Joseph Davaine (1812–1882) discovered the antiseptic action of iodine. Antonio Grossich (1849–1926), an Istrian-born surgeon, was among the first to use sterilisation of the operative field. In 1908, he introduced tincture of iodine as a way to rapidly sterilise the human skin in the surgical field.

In early periodic tables, iodine was often given the symbol J, for Jod, its name in German.

Properties

Iodine is the fourth halogen, being a member of group 17 in the periodic table, below fluorine, chlorine, and bromine; it is the heaviest stable member of its group. (The fifth and sixth halogens, the radioactive astatine and tennessine, are not well-studied due to their expense and inaccessibility in large quantities, but appear to show various unusual properties for the group due to relativistic effects.) Iodine has an electron configuration of [Kr]4d105s25p5, with the seven electrons in the fifth and outermost shell being its valence electrons. Like the other halogens, it is one electron short of a full octet and is hence an oxidising agent, reacting with many elements in order to complete its outer shell, although in keeping with periodic trends, it is the weakest oxidising agent among the stable halogens: it has the lowest electronegativity among them, just 2.66 on the Pauling scale (compare fluorine, chlorine, and bromine at 3.98, 3.16, and 2.96 respectively; astatine continues the trend with an electronegativity of 2.2). Elemental iodine hence forms diatomic molecules with chemical formula I2, where two iodine atoms share a pair of electrons in order to each achieve a stable octet for themselves; at high temperatures, these diatomic molecules reversibly dissociate a pair of iodine atoms. Similarly, the iodide anion, I−, is the strongest reducing agent among the stable halogens, being the most easily oxidised back to diatomic I2. (Astatine goes further, being indeed unstable as At− and readily oxidised to At0 or At+.)

The halogens darken in colour as the group is descended: fluorine is a very pale yellow, chlorine is greenish-yellow, bromine is reddish-brown, and iodine is violet.

Elemental iodine is slightly soluble in water, with one gram dissolving in 3450 ml at 20 °C and 1280 ml at 50 °C; potassium iodide may be added to increase solubility via formation of triiodide ions, among other polyiodides. Nonpolar solvents such as hexane and carbon tetrachloride provide a higher solubility. Polar solutions, such as aqueous solutions, are brown, reflecting the role of these solvents as Lewis bases; on the other hand, nonpolar solutions are violet, the color of iodine vapour. Charge-transfer complexes form when iodine is dissolved in polar solvents, hence changing the colour. Iodine is violet when dissolved in carbon tetrachloride and saturated hydrocarbons but deep brown in alcohols and amines, solvents that form charge-transfer adducts.

The melting and boiling points of iodine are the highest among the halogens, conforming to the increasing trend down the group, since iodine has the largest electron cloud among them that is the most easily polarised, resulting in its molecules having the strongest van der Waals interactions among the halogens. Similarly, iodine is the least volatile of the halogens, though the solid still can be observed to give off purple vapor. Due to this property Iodine is commonly used to demonstrate sublimation directly from solid to gas, which gives rise to a misconception that it does not melt in atmospheric pressure. Because it has the largest atomic radius among the halogens, iodine has the lowest first ionisation energy, lowest electron affinity, lowest electronegativity and lowest reactivity of the halogens.

The interhalogen bond in diiodine is the weakest of all the halogens. As such, 1% of a sample of gaseous iodine at atmospheric pressure is dissociated into iodine atoms at 575 °C. Temperatures greater than 750 °C are required for fluorine, chlorine, and bromine to dissociate to a similar extent. Most bonds to iodine are weaker than the analogous bonds to the lighter halogens. Gaseous iodine is composed of I2 molecules with an I–I bond length of 266.6 pm. The I–I bond is one of the longest single bonds known. It is even longer (271.5 pm) in solid orthorhombic crystalline iodine, which has the same crystal structure as chlorine and bromine. (The record is held by iodine's neighbour xenon: the Xe–Xe bond length is 308.71 pm.) As such, within the iodine molecule, significant electronic interactions occur with the two next-nearest neighbours of each atom, and these interactions give rise, in bulk iodine, to a shiny appearance and semiconducting properties. Iodine is a two-dimensional semiconductor with a band gap of 1.3 eV (125 kJ/mol): it is a semiconductor in the plane of its crystalline layers and an insulator in the perpendicular direction.

Isotopes

Of the thirty-seven known isotopes of iodine, only one occurs in nature, iodine-127. The others are radioactive and have half-lives too short to be primordial. As such, iodine is both monoisotopic and mononuclidic and its atomic weight is known to great precision, as it is a constant of nature.

The longest-lived of the radioactive isotopes of iodine is iodine-129, which has a half-life of 15.7 million years, decaying via beta decay to stable xenon-129. Some iodine-129 was formed along with iodine-127 before the formation of the Solar System, but it has by now completely decayed away, making it an extinct radionuclide that is nevertheless still useful in dating the history of the early Solar System or very old groundwaters, due to its mobility in the environment. Its former presence may be determined from an excess of its daughter xenon-129. Traces of iodine-129 still exist today, as it is also a cosmogenic nuclide, formed from cosmic ray spallation of atmospheric xenon: these traces make up 10−14 to 10−10 of all terrestrial iodine. It also occurs from open-air nuclear testing, and is not hazardous because of its very long half-life, the longest of all fission products. At the peak of thermonuclear testing in the 1960s and 1970s, iodine-129 still made up only about 10−7 of all terrestrial iodine. Excited states of iodine-127 and iodine-129 are often used in Mössbauer spectroscopy.

The other iodine radioisotopes have much shorter half-lives, no longer than days. Some of them have medical applications involving the thyroid gland, where the iodine that enters the body is stored and concentrated. Iodine-123 has a half-life of thirteen hours and decays by electron capture to tellurium-123, emitting gamma radiation; it is used in nuclear medicine imaging, including single photon emission computed tomography (SPECT) and X-ray computed tomography (X-Ray CT) scans. Iodine-125 has a half-life of fifty-nine days, decaying by electron capture to tellurium-125 and emitting low-energy gamma radiation; the second-longest-lived iodine radioisotope, it has uses in biological assays, nuclear medicine imaging and in radiation therapy as brachytherapy to treat a number of conditions, including prostate cancer, uveal melanomas, and brain tumours. Finally, iodine-131, with a half-life of eight days, beta decays to an excited state of stable xenon-131 that then converts to the ground state by emitting gamma radiation. It is a common fission product and thus is present in high levels in radioactive fallout. It may then be absorbed through contaminated food, and will also accumulate in the thyroid. As it decays, it may cause damage to the thyroid. The primary risk from exposure to high levels of iodine-131 is the chance occurrence of radiogenic thyroid cancer in later life. Other risks include the possibility of non-cancerous growths and thyroiditis.

The usual means of protection against the negative effects of iodine-131 is by saturating the thyroid gland with stable iodine-127 in the form of potassium iodide tablets, taken daily for optimal prophylaxis. However, iodine-131 may also be used for medicinal purposes in radiation therapy for this very reason, when tissue destruction is desired after iodine uptake by the tissue. Iodine-131 is also used as a radioactive tracer.

Chemistry and compounds 

Iodine is quite reactive, but it is much less reactive than the other halogens. For example, while chlorine gas will halogenate carbon monoxide, nitric oxide, and sulfur dioxide (to phosgene, nitrosyl chloride, and sulfuryl chloride respectively), iodine will not do so. Furthermore, iodination of metals tends to result in lower oxidation states than chlorination or bromination; for example, rhenium metal reacts with chlorine to form rhenium hexachloride, but with bromine it forms only rhenium pentabromide and iodine can achieve only rhenium tetraiodide. By the same token, however, since iodine has the lowest ionisation energy among the halogens and is the most easily oxidised of them, it has a more significant cationic chemistry and its higher oxidation states are rather more stable than those of bromine and chlorine, for example in iodine heptafluoride.

Charge-transfer complexes 
The iodine molecule, I2, dissolves in CCl4 and aliphatic hydrocarbons to give bright violet solutions. In these solvents the absorption band maximum occurs in the 520 – 540 nm region and is assigned to a * to σ* transition.   When I2 reacts with Lewis bases in these solvents a blue shift in I2 peak is seen and the new peak (230 – 330 nm) arises that is due to the formation of adducts, which are referred to as charge-transfer complexes.

Hydrogen iodide
The simplest compound of iodine is hydrogen iodide, HI. It is a colourless gas that reacts with oxygen to give water and iodine. Although it is useful in iodination reactions in the laboratory, it does not have large-scale industrial uses, unlike the other hydrogen halides. Commercially, it is usually made by reacting iodine with hydrogen sulfide or hydrazine:
2 I2 + N2H4  4 HI + N2
At room temperature, it is a colourless gas, like all of the hydrogen halides except hydrogen fluoride, since hydrogen cannot form strong hydrogen bonds to the large and only mildly electronegative iodine atom. It melts at −51.0 °C and boils at −35.1 °C. It is an endothermic compound that can exothermically dissociate at room temperature, although the process is very slow unless a catalyst is present: the reaction between hydrogen and iodine at room temperature to give hydrogen iodide does not proceed to completion. The H–I bond dissociation energy is likewise the smallest of the hydrogen halides, at 295 kJ/mol.

Aqueous hydrogen iodide is known as hydroiodic acid, which is a strong acid. Hydrogen iodide is exceptionally soluble in water: one litre of water will dissolve 425 litres of hydrogen iodide, and the saturated solution has only four water molecules per molecule of hydrogen iodide. Commercial so-called "concentrated" hydroiodic acid usually contains 48–57% HI by mass; the solution forms an azeotrope with boiling point 126.7 °C at 56.7 g HI per 100 g solution. Hence hydroiodic acid cannot be concentrated past this point by evaporation of water.

Anhydrous hydrogen iodide is a poor solvent, able to dissolve only small molecular compounds such as nitrosyl chloride and phenol, or salts with very low lattice energies such as tetraalkylammonium halides.

Other binary iodine compounds
With the exception of the noble gases, nearly all elements on the periodic table up to einsteinium (EsI3 is known) are known to form binary compounds with iodine.  Until 1990, nitrogen triiodide was only known as an ammonia adduct.  Ammonia-free NI3 was found to be isolable at –196 °C but spontaneously decomposes at 0 °C.  For thermodynamic reasons related to electronegativity of the elements, neutral sulfur and selenium iodides that are stable at room temperature are also nonexistent, although S2I2 and SI2 are stable up to 183 and 9 K, respectively.  As of 2022, no neutral binary selenium iodide has been unambiguously identified (at any temperature).   Sulfur- and selenium-iodine polyatomic cations (e.g., [S2I42+][AsF6–]2 and [Se2I42+][Sb2F11–]2) have been prepared and characterized crystallographically.

Given the large size of the iodide anion and iodine's weak oxidising power, high oxidation states are difficult to achieve in binary iodides, the maximum known being in the pentaiodides of niobium, tantalum, and protactinium. Iodides can be made by reaction of an element or its oxide, hydroxide, or carbonate with hydroiodic acid, and then dehydrated by mildly high temperatures combined with either low pressure or anhydrous hydrogen iodide gas. These methods work best when the iodide product is stable to hydrolysis; otherwise, the possibilities include high-temperature oxidative iodination of the element with iodine or hydrogen iodide, high-temperature iodination of a metal oxide or other halide by iodine, a volatile metal halide, carbon tetraiodide, or an organic iodide. For example, molybdenum(IV) oxide reacts with aluminium(III) iodide at 230 °C to give molybdenum(II) iodide. An example involving halogen exchange is given below, involving the reaction of tantalum(V) chloride with excess aluminium(III) iodide at 400 °C to give tantalum(V) iodide:

 3TaCl5 + \underset{(excess)}{5AlI3} -> 3TaI5 + 5AlCl3

Lower iodides may be produced either through thermal decomposition or disproportionation, or by reducing the higher iodide with hydrogen or a metal, for example:

 TaI5{} + Ta ->[\text{thermal gradient}] [\ce{630^\circ C\ ->\ 575^\circ C}] Ta6I14

Most metal iodides with the metal in low oxidation states (+1 to +3) are ionic. Nonmetals tend to form covalent molecular iodides, as do metals in high oxidation states from +3 and above. Both ionic and covalent iodides are known for metals in oxidation state +3 (e.g. scandium iodide is mostly ionic, but aluminium iodide is not). Ionic iodides MIn tend to have the lowest melting and boiling points among the halides MXn of the same element, because the electrostatic forces of attraction between the cations and anions are weakest for the large iodide anion. In contrast, covalent iodides tend to instead have the highest melting and boiling points among the halides of the same element, since iodine is the most polarisable of the halogens and, having the most electrons among them, can contribute the most to van der Waals forces. Naturally, exceptions abound in intermediate iodides where one trend gives way to the other. Similarly, solubilities in water of predominantly ionic iodides (e.g. potassium and calcium) are the greatest among ionic halides of that element, while those of covalent iodides (e.g. silver) are the lowest of that element. In particular, silver iodide is very insoluble in water and its formation is often used as a qualitative test for iodine.

Iodine halides
The halogens form many binary, diamagnetic interhalogen compounds with stoichiometries XY, XY3, XY5, and XY7 (where X is heavier than Y), and iodine is no exception. Iodine forms all three possible diatomic interhalogens, a trifluoride and trichloride, as well as a pentafluoride and, exceptionally among the halogens, a heptafluoride. Apart from these, some pseudohalides are also known, such as cyanogen iodide (ICN), iodine thiocyanate (ISCN), and iodine azide (IN3).

Iodine monofluoride (IF) is unstable at room temperature and disproportionates very readily and irreversibly to iodine and iodine pentafluoride, and thus cannot be obtained pure. It can be synthesised from the reaction of iodine with fluorine gas in trichlorofluoromethane at −45 °C, with iodine trifluoride in trichlorofluoromethane at −78 °C, or with silver(I) fluoride at 0 °C. Iodine monochloride (ICl) and iodine monobromide (IBr), on the other hand, are moderately stable. The former, a volatile red-brown compound, was discovered independently by Joseph Louis Gay-Lussac and Humphry Davy in 1813–1814 not long after the discoveries of chlorine and iodine, and it mimics the intermediate halogen bromine so well that Justus von Liebig was misled into mistaking bromine (which he had found) for iodine monochloride. Iodine monochloride and iodine monobromide may be prepared simply by reacting iodine with chlorine or bromine at room temperature and purified by fractional crystallisation. Both are quite reactive and attack even platinum and gold, though not boron, carbon, cadmium, lead, zirconium, niobium, molybdenum, and tungsten. Their reaction with organic compounds depends on conditions. Iodine chloride vapour tends to chlorinate phenol and salicyclic acid, since when iodine chloride undergoes homolytic dissociation, chlorine and iodine are produced and the former is more reactive. However, iodine chloride in tetrachloromethane solution results in iodination being the main reaction, since now heterolytic fission of the I–Cl bond occurs and I+ attacks phenol as an electrophile. However, iodine monobromide tends to brominate phenol even in tetrachloromethane solution because it tends to dissociate into its elements in solution, and bromine is more reactive than iodine. When liquid, iodine monochloride and iodine monobromide dissociate into  and  anions (X = Cl, Br); thus they are significant conductors of electricity and can be used as ionising solvents.

Iodine trifluoride (IF3) is an unstable yellow solid that decomposes above −28 °C. It is thus little-known. It is difficult to produce because fluorine gas would tend to oxidise iodine all the way to the pentafluoride; reaction at low temperature with xenon difluoride is necessary. Iodine trichloride, which exists in the solid state as the planar dimer I2Cl6, is a bright yellow solid, synthesised by reacting iodine with liquid chlorine at −80 °C; caution is necessary during purification because it easily dissociates to iodine monochloride and chlorine and hence can act as a strong chlorinating agent.

Iodine pentafluoride (IF5), a colourless, volatile liquid, is the most thermodynamically stable iodine fluoride, and can be made by reacting iodine with fluorine gas at room temperature. It is a fluorinating agent, but is mild enough to store in glass apparatus. The pentagonal bipyramidal iodine heptafluoride (IF7) is an extremely powerful fluorinating agent, behind only chlorine trifluoride, chlorine pentafluoride, and bromine pentafluoride among the interhalogens: it reacts with almost all the elements even at low temperatures, fluorinates Pyrex glass to form iodine(VII) oxyfluoride (IOF5), and sets carbon monoxide on fire.

Iodine oxides and oxoacids

Iodine oxides are the most stable of all the halogen oxides, because of the strong I–O bonds resulting from the large electronegativity difference between iodine and oxygen, and they have been known for the longest time. The stable, white, hygroscopic iodine pentoxide (I2O5) has been known since its formation in 1813 by Gay-Lussac and Davy. It is most easily made by the dehydration of iodic acid (HIO3), of which it is the anhydride. It will quickly oxidise carbon monoxide completely to carbon dioxide at room temperature, and is thus a useful reagent in determining carbon monoxide concentration. It also oxidises nitrogen oxide, ethylene, and hydrogen sulfide. It reacts with sulfur trioxide and peroxydisulfuryl difluoride (S2O6F2) to form salts of the iodyl cation, [IO2]+, and is reduced by concentrated sulfuric acids to iodosyl salts involving [IO]+. It may be fluorinated by fluorine, bromine trifluoride, sulfur tetrafluoride, or chloryl fluoride, resulting iodine pentafluoride, which also reacts with iodine pentoxide, giving iodine(V) oxyfluoride, IOF3. A few other less stable oxides are known, notably I4O9 and I2O4; their structures have not been determined, but reasonable guesses are IIII(IVO3)3 and [IO]+[IO3]− respectively.

More important are the four oxoacids: hypoiodous acid (HIO), iodous acid (HIO2), iodic acid (HIO3), and periodic acid (HIO4 or H5IO6). When iodine dissolves in aqueous solution, the following reactions occur:
{|
|-
| I2 + H2O ||  HIO + H+ + I− || Kac = 2.0 × 10−13 mol2 l−2
|-
| I2 + 2 OH− ||  IO− + H2O + I− || Kalk = 30 mol2 l−2
|}

Hypoiodous acid is unstable to disproportionation. The hypoiodite ions thus formed disproportionate immediately to give iodide and iodate:
{|
|-
| 3 IO−  2 I− +  || K = 1020
|}

Iodous acid and iodite are even less stable and exist only as a fleeting intermediate in the oxidation of iodide to iodate, if at all. Iodates are by far the most important of these compounds, which can be made by oxidising alkali metal iodides with oxygen at 600 °C and high pressure, or by oxidising iodine with chlorates. Unlike chlorates, which disproportionate very slowly to form chloride and perchlorate, iodates are stable to disproportionation in both acidic and alkaline solutions. From these, salts of most metals can be obtained. Iodic acid is most easily made by oxidation of an aqueous iodine suspension by electrolysis or fuming nitric acid. Iodate has the weakest oxidising power of the halates, but reacts the quickest.

They are usually made by oxidising alkaline sodium iodate electrochemically (with lead(IV) oxide as the anode) or by chlorine gas:
 + 6 OH− →  + 3 H2O + 2 e−
 + 6 OH− + Cl2 →  + 2 Cl− + 3 H2O

Orthoperiodate especially stabilises high oxidation states among metals because of its very high negative charge of −5. Orthoperiodic acid, H5IO6, is stable, and dehydrates at 100 °C in a vacuum to metaperiodic acid, HIO4. Attempting to go further does not result in the nonexistent iodine heptoxide (I2O7), but rather iodine pentoxide and oxygen.

Polyiodine compounds
When iodine dissolves in strong acids, such as fuming sulfuric acid, a bright blue paramagnetic solution including  cations is formed. A solid salt of the diiodine cation may be obtained by oxidising iodine with antimony pentafluoride:
2 I2 + 5 SbF5  2 I2Sb2F11 + SbF3
The salt I2Sb2F11 is dark blue, and the blue tantalum analogue I2Ta2F11 is also known. In fluorosulfuric acid solution, deep-blue  reversibly dimerises below −60 °C, forming red rectangular diamagnetic .

The only important polyiodide anion in aqueous solution is linear triiodide, . Its formation explains why the solubility of iodine in water may be increased by the addition of potassium iodide solution:
I2 + I−   (Keq = ~700 at 20 °C)

Organoiodine compounds

Organoiodine compounds have been fundamental in the development of organic synthesis, such as in the Hofmann elimination of amines, the Williamson ether synthesis, the Wurtz coupling reaction, and in Grignard reagents.

The carbon–iodine bond is a common functional group that forms part of core organic chemistry; formally, these compounds may be thought of as organic derivatives of the iodide anion. The simplest organoiodine compounds, alkyl iodides, may be synthesised by the reaction of alcohols with phosphorus triiodide; these may then be used in nucleophilic substitution reactions, or for preparing Grignard reagents. The C–I bond is the weakest of all the carbon–halogen bonds due to the minuscule difference in electronegativity between carbon (2.55) and iodine (2.66). As such, iodide is the best leaving group among the halogens, to such an extent that many organoiodine compounds turn yellow when stored over time due to decomposition into elemental iodine; as such, they are commonly used in organic synthesis, because of the easy formation and cleavage of the C–I bond. They are also significantly denser than the other organohalogen compounds thanks to the high atomic weight of iodine. A few organic oxidising agents like the iodanes contain iodine in a higher oxidation state than −1, such as 2-iodoxybenzoic acid, a common reagent for the oxidation of alcohols to aldehydes, and iodobenzene dichloride (PhICl2), used for the selective chlorination of alkenes and alkynes. One of the more well-known uses of organoiodine compounds is the so-called iodoform test, where iodoform (CHI3) is produced by the exhaustive iodination of a methyl ketone (or another compound capable of being oxidised to a methyl ketone), as follows:

Some drawbacks of using organoiodine compounds as compared to organochlorine or organobromine compounds is the greater expense and toxicity of the iodine derivatives, since iodine is expensive and organoiodine compounds are stronger alkylating agents. For example, iodoacetamide and iodoacetic acid denature proteins by irreversibly alkylating cysteine residues and preventing the reformation of disulfide linkages.

Halogen exchange to produce iodoalkanes by the Finkelstein reaction is slightly complicated by the fact that iodide is a better leaving group than chloride or bromide. The difference is nevertheless small enough that the reaction can be driven to completion by exploiting the differential solubility of halide salts, or by using a large excess of the halide salt. In the classic Finkelstein reaction, an alkyl chloride or an alkyl bromide is converted to an alkyl iodide by treatment with a solution of sodium iodide in acetone. Sodium iodide is soluble in acetone and sodium chloride and sodium bromide are not. The reaction is driven toward products by mass action due to the precipitation of the insoluble salt.

Occurrence and production
Iodine is the least abundant of the stable halogens, comprising only 0.46 parts per million of Earth's crustal rocks (compare: fluorine 544 ppm, chlorine 126 ppm, bromine 2.5 ppm). Among the 84 elements which occur in significant quantities (elements 1–42, 44–60, 62–83, 90 and 92), it ranks 61st in abundance. Iodide minerals are rare, and most deposits that are concentrated enough for economical extraction are iodate minerals instead. Examples include lautarite, Ca(IO3)2, and dietzeite, 7Ca(IO3)2·8CaCrO4. These are the minerals that occur as trace impurities in the caliche, found in Chile, whose main product is sodium nitrate. In total, they can contain at least 0.02% and at most 1% iodine by mass. Sodium iodate is extracted from the caliche and reduced to iodide by sodium bisulfite. This solution is then reacted with freshly extracted iodate, resulting in comproportionation to iodine, which may be filtered off.

The caliche was the main source of iodine in the 19th century and continues to be important today, replacing kelp (which is no longer an economically viable source), but in the late 20th century brines emerged as a comparable source. The Japanese Minami Kanto gas field east of Tokyo and the American Anadarko Basin gas field in northwest Oklahoma are the two largest such sources. The brine is hotter than 60 °C from the depth of the source. The brine is first purified and acidified using sulfuric acid, then the iodide present is oxidised to iodine with chlorine. An iodine solution is produced, but is dilute and must be concentrated. Air is blown into the solution to evaporate the iodine, which is passed into an absorbing tower, where sulfur dioxide reduces the iodine. The hydrogen iodide (HI) is reacted with chlorine to precipitate the iodine. After filtering and purification the iodine is packed.

 2 HI + Cl2 → I2↑ + 2 HCl
 I2 + 2 H2O + SO2 → 2 HI + H2SO4
 2 HI + Cl2 → I2↓ + 2 HCl

These sources ensure that Chile and Japan are the largest producers of iodine today. Alternatively, the brine may be treated with silver nitrate to precipitate out iodine as silver iodide, which is then decomposed by reaction with iron to form metallic silver and a solution of iron(II) iodide. The iodine may then be liberated by displacement with chlorine.

Applications
About half of all produced iodine goes into various organoiodine compounds, another 15% remains as the pure element, another 15% is used to form potassium iodide, and another 15% for other inorganic iodine compounds. Among the major uses of iodine compounds are catalysts, animal feed supplements, stabilisers, dyes, colourants and pigments, pharmaceutical, sanitation (from tincture of iodine), and photography; minor uses include smog inhibition, cloud seeding, and various uses in analytical chemistry.

Chemical analysis

The iodide and iodate anions are often used for quantitative volumetric analysis, for example in iodometry. Iodine and starch form a blue complex, and this reaction is often used to test for either starch or iodine and as an indicator in iodometry. The iodine test for starch is still used to detect counterfeit banknotes printed on starch-containing paper.

The iodine value is the mass of iodine in grams that is consumed by 100 grams of a chemical substance typically fats or oils. Iodine numbers are often used to determine the amount of unsaturation in fatty acids. This unsaturation is in the form of double bonds, which react with iodine compounds.

Potassium tetraiodomercurate(II), K2HgI4, is also known as Nessler's reagent. It is often used as a sensitive spot test for ammonia. Similarly, Mayer's reagent (potassium tetraiodomercurate(II) solution) is used as a precipitating reagent to test for alkaloids. Aqueous alkaline iodine solution is used in the iodoform test for methyl ketones.

Spectroscopy 
The spectrum of the iodine molecule, I2, consists of (not exclusively) tens of thousands of sharp spectral lines in the wavelength range 500–700 nm. It is therefore a commonly used wavelength reference (secondary standard). By measuring with a spectroscopic Doppler-free technique while focusing on one of these lines, the hyperfine structure of the iodine molecule reveals itself. A line is now resolved such that either 15 components (from even rotational quantum numbers, Jeven), or 21 components (from odd rotational quantum numbers, Jodd) are measurable.

Cesium iodide and thallium-doped sodium iodide are used in crystal scintillators for the detection of gamma rays. The efficiency is high and energy dispersive spectroscopy is possible, but the resolution is rather poor.

Spacecraft propulsion
Propulsion systems employing iodine as the propellant can be built more compactly, with less mass (and cost), and operate more efficiently than the gridded ion thrusters that were utilized to propel previous spacecraft, such as Japan's Hayabusa probes, ESA's GOCE satellite, or NASA's DART mission, all of which used xenon as the reaction mass. Iodine's atomic weight is only 3.3% less than that of xenon, while its first two ionisation energies average 12% less; together, these make iodine ions a promising substitute.

Use of iodine should allow more widespread application of ion-thrust technology, particularly with smaller-scale space vehicles. According to the European Space Agency, "This small but potentially disruptive innovation could help to clear the skies of space junk, by enabling tiny satellites to self-destruct cheaply and easily at the end of their missions, by steering themselves into the atmosphere where they would burn up."

In early 2021, the French group ThrustMe performed an in-orbit demonstration of an electric-powered ion thruster for spacecraft, where iodine was used in lieu of xenon as the source of plasma, in order to generate thrust by accelerating ions with an electrostatic field.

Medicine

Elemental iodine
Elemental iodine is used as an antiseptic either as the element, or as the water-soluble triiodide anion I3− generated in situ by adding iodide to poorly water-soluble elemental iodine (the reverse chemical reaction makes some free elemental iodine available for antisepsis). Elemental iodine may also be used to treat iodine deficiency.

In the alternative, iodine may be produced from iodophors, which contain iodine complexed with a solubilizing agent (the iodide ion may be thought of loosely as the iodophor in triiodide water solutions). Examples of such preparations include:

 Tincture of iodine: iodine in ethanol, or iodine and sodium iodide in a mixture of ethanol and water.
 Lugol's iodine: iodine and iodide in water alone, forming mostly triiodide. Unlike tincture of iodine, Lugol's iodine has a minimised amount of the free iodine (I2) component.
 Povidone iodine (an iodophor).
 Iodine-V: iodine (I2)  and fulvic acid form a clathrate compound (iodine molecules are "caged" by fulvic acid in this host-guest complex). A water-soluble, solid, stable, crystalline complex. Unlike other iodophors, Iodine-V only contains iodine in molecular (I2) form.

The antimicrobial action of iodine is quick and works at low concentrations, and thus it is used in operating theatres. Its specific mode of action is unknown. It penetrates into microorganisms and attacks particular amino acids (such as cysteine and methionine), nucleotides, and fatty acids, ultimately resulting in cell death. It also has an antiviral action, but nonlipid viruses and parvoviruses are less sensitive than lipid enveloped viruses. Iodine probably attacks surface proteins of enveloped viruses, and it may also destabilise membrane fatty acids by reacting with unsaturated carbon bonds.

Other formulations
Before the advent of organic chelating agents, salts of iodide were given orally in the treatment of lead or mercury poisoning, such as heavily popularized by Louis Melsens and many nineteenth and early twentieth century doctors.

In medicine, a saturated solution of potassium iodide is used to treat acute thyrotoxicosis. It is also used to block uptake of iodine-131 in the thyroid gland (see isotopes section above), when this isotope is used as part of radiopharmaceuticals (such as iobenguane) that are not targeted to the thyroid or thyroid-type tissues.

Iodine-131 (usually as iodide) is a component of nuclear fallout, and is particularly dangerous owing to the thyroid gland's propensity to concentrate ingested iodine and retain it for periods longer than this isotope's radiological half-life of eight days. For this reason, people at risk of exposure to environmental radioactive iodine (iodine-131) in fallout may be instructed to take non-radioactive potassium iodide tablets. The typical adult dose is one 130 mg tablet per 24 hours, supplying 100 mg (100,000 micrograms) of ionic iodine. (The typical daily dose of iodine for normal health is of order 100 micrograms; see "Dietary Intake" below.) Ingestion of this large dose of non-radioactive iodine minimises the uptake of radioactive iodine by the thyroid gland.

As an element with high electron density and atomic number, iodine absorbs X-rays weaker than 33.3 keV due to the photoelectric effect of the innermost electrons. Organoiodine compounds are used with intravenous injection as X-ray radiocontrast agents. This application is often in conjunction with advanced X-ray techniques such as angiography and CT scanning. At present, all water-soluble radiocontrast agents rely on iodine-containing compounds.

Others

The production of ethylenediamine dihydroiodide, provided as a nutritional supplement for livestock, consumes a large portion of available iodine. Another significant use is a catalyst for the production of acetic acid by the Monsanto and Cativa processes. In these technologies, which support the world's demand for acetic acid, hydroiodic acid converts the methanol feedstock into methyl iodide, which undergoes carbonylation. Hydrolysis of the resulting acetyl iodide regenerates hydroiodic acid and gives acetic acid.

Inorganic iodides find specialised uses. Titanium, zirconium, hafnium, and thorium are purified by the van Arkel–de Boer process, which involves the reversible formation of the tetraiodides of these elements. Silver iodide is a major ingredient to traditional photographic film. Thousands of kilograms of silver iodide are used annually for cloud seeding to induce rain.

The organoiodine compound erythrosine is an important food coloring agent. Perfluoroalkyl iodides are precursors to important surfactants, such as perfluorooctanesulfonic acid.

The iodine clock reaction (in which iodine also serves as a test for starch, forming a dark blue complex), is a popular educational demonstration experiment and example of a seemingly oscillating reaction (it is only the concentration of an intermediate product that oscillates).

Although iodine has widespread roles in many species, agents containing it can exert a differential effect upon different species in an agricultural system. The growth of all strains of Fusarium verticillioides is significantly inhibited by an iodine-containing fungistatic (AJ1629-34EC) at concentrations that do not harm the crop. This might be a less toxic anti-fungal agricultural treatment due to its relatively natural chemistry.

I is used as the radiolabel in investigating which ligands go to which plant pattern recognition receptors (PRRs).

Biological role

Iodine is an essential element for life and, at atomic number Z = 53, is the heaviest element commonly needed by living organisms. (Lanthanum and the other lanthanides, as well as tungsten with Z = 74 and uranium with Z = 92, are used by a few microorganisms.) It is required for the synthesis of the growth-regulating thyroid hormones thyroxine and triiodothyronine (T4 and T3 respectively, named after their number of iodine atoms). A deficiency of iodine leads to decreased production of T3 and T4 and a concomitant enlargement of the thyroid tissue in an attempt to obtain more iodine, causing the disease known as simple goitre. The major form of thyroid hormone in the blood is thyroxine (T4), which has a longer half-life than T3. In humans, the ratio of T4 to T3 released into the blood is between 14:1 and 20:1. T4 is converted to the active T3 (three to four times more potent than T4) within cells by deiodinases (5'-iodinase). These are further processed by decarboxylation and deiodination to produce iodothyronamine (T1a) and thyronamine (T0a'). All three isoforms of the deiodinases are selenium-containing enzymes; thus dietary selenium is essential for T3 production.

Iodine accounts for 65% of the molecular weight of T4 and 59% of T3. Fifteen to 20 mg of iodine is concentrated in thyroid tissue and hormones, but 70% of all iodine in the body is found in other tissues, including mammary glands, eyes, gastric mucosa, fetal thymus, cerebro-spinal fluid and choroid plexus, arterial walls, the cervix, and salivary glands. During pregnancy, the placenta is able to store and accumulate iodine. In the cells of those tissues, iodide enters directly by sodium-iodide symporter (NIS). The action of iodine in mammary tissue is related to fetal and neonatal development, but in the other tissues, it is (at least) partially unknown.

Dietary intake
The daily levels of intake recommended by the United States National Academy of Medicine are between 110 and 130 µg for infants up to 12 months, 90 µg for children up to eight years, 130 µg for children up to 13 years, 150 µg for adults, 220 µg for pregnant women and 290 µg for lactation. The Tolerable Upper Intake Level (UL) for adults is 1,100 μg/day. This upper limit was assessed by analyzing the effect of supplementation on thyroid-stimulating hormone.

The thyroid gland needs no more than 70 μg/day to synthesise the requisite daily amounts of T4 and T3. The higher recommended daily allowance levels of iodine seem necessary for optimal function of a number of body systems, including lactation, gastric mucosa, salivary glands, brain cells, choroid plexus, thymus, and arterial walls.

Natural sources of dietary iodine include seafood, such as fish, seaweeds (such as kelp) and shellfish, dairy products and eggs so long as the animals received enough iodine, and plants grown on iodine-rich soil. Iodised salt is fortified with iodine in the form of sodium iodide.

As of 2000, the median intake of iodine from food in the United States was 240 to 300 μg/day for men and 190 to 210 μg/day for women. The general US population has adequate iodine nutrition, with women of childbearing age and pregnant women having a possible mild risk of deficiency. In Japan, consumption was considered much higher, ranging between 5,280 μg/day to 13,800 μg/day from dietary seaweed or kombu kelp, often in the form of kombu umami extracts for soup stock and potato chips. However, new studies suggest that Japan's consumption is closer to 1,000–3,000 μg/day. The adult UL in Japan was last revised to 3,000 µg/day in 2015.

After iodine fortification programs such as iodisation of salt have been implemented, some cases of iodine-induced hyperthyroidism have been observed (so-called Jod-Basedow phenomenon). The condition seems to occur mainly in people over forty, and the risk appears higher when iodine deficiency is severe and the initial rise in iodine intake is high.

Deficiency

In areas where there is little iodine in the diet, typically remote inland areas and semi-arid equatorial climates where no marine foods are eaten, iodine deficiency gives rise to hypothyroidism, symptoms of which are extreme fatigue, goitre, mental slowing, depression, weight gain, and low basal body temperatures. Iodine deficiency is the leading cause of preventable intellectual disability, a result that occurs primarily when babies or small children are rendered hypothyroidic by a lack of the element. The addition of iodine to table salt has largely eliminated this problem in wealthier nations, but iodine deficiency remains a serious public health problem in the developing world today. Iodine deficiency is also a problem in certain areas of Europe. Information processing, fine motor skills, and visual problem solving are improved by iodine repletion in moderately iodine-deficient children.

Precautions

Toxicity

Elemental iodine (I2) is toxic if taken orally undiluted. The lethal dose for an adult human is 30 mg/kg, which is about 2.1–2.4 grams for a human weighing 70 to 80 kg (even if experiments on rats demonstrated that these animals could survive after eating a 14000 mg/kg dose). Excess iodine can be more cytotoxic in the presence of selenium deficiency. Iodine supplementation in selenium-deficient populations is, in theory, problematic, partly for this reason. The toxicity derives from its oxidizing properties, through which it denaturates proteins (including enzymes).

Elemental iodine is also a skin irritant. Direct contact with skin can cause damage, and solid iodine crystals should be handled with care. Solutions with high elemental iodine concentration, such as tincture of iodine and Lugol's solution, are capable of causing tissue damage if used in prolonged cleaning or antisepsis; similarly, liquid Povidone-iodine (Betadine) trapped against the skin resulted in chemical burns in some reported cases.

Occupational exposure 
People can be exposed to iodine in the workplace by inhalation, ingestion, skin contact, and eye contact. The Occupational Safety and Health Administration (OSHA) has set the legal limit (Permissible exposure limit) for iodine exposure in the workplace at 0.1 ppm (1 mg/m3) during an 8-hour workday. The National Institute for Occupational Safety and Health (NIOSH) has set a Recommended exposure limit (REL) of 0.1 ppm (1 mg/m3) during an 8-hour workday. At levels of 2 ppm, iodine is immediately dangerous to life and health.

Allergic reactions
Some people develop a hypersensitivity to products and foods containing iodine. Applications of tincture of iodine or Betadine can cause rashes, sometimes severe. Parenteral use of iodine-based contrast agents (see above) can cause reactions ranging from a mild rash to fatal anaphylaxis. Such reactions have led to the misconception (widely held, even among physicians) that some people are allergic to iodine itself; even allergies to iodine-rich seafood have been so construed. In fact, there has never been a confirmed report of a true iodine allergy, and an allergy to elemental iodine or simple iodide salts is theoretically impossible. Hypersensitivity reactions to products and foods containing iodine are apparently related to their other molecular components; thus, a person who has demonstrated an allergy to one food or product containing iodine may not have an allergic reaction to another. Patients with various food allergies (shellfish, egg, milk, etc.) do not have an increased risk for a contrast medium hypersensitivity. As with all medications, the patient's allergy history should be questioned and consulted before any containing iodine are administered.

US DEA List I status
Phosphorus can reduce elemental iodine to hydroiodic acid, which is a reagent effective for reducing ephedrine or pseudoephedrine to methamphetamine. For this reason, iodine was designated by the United States Drug Enforcement Administration as a List I precursor chemical under 21 CFR 1310.02.

References

Bibliography
 

 
Chemical elements
Halogens
Reactive nonmetals
Diatomic nonmetals
Dietary minerals
Oxidizing agents
Gases with color
Chemical elements with primitive orthorhombic structure